Cassandra Williams is a Dominican politician from the Dominica Labour Party who was elected MP for La Plaine constituency in the 2022 general election. Following her election she was appointed Minister of State responsible for Seniors Security by Prime Minister Roosevelt Skerrit.

References 

Living people
Year of birth missing (living people)
Place of birth missing (living people)
21st-century Dominica politicians
21st-century Dominica women politicians
Dominica Labour Party politicians
Members of the House of Assembly of Dominica
Women government ministers of Dominica